Subarnarekha Mahavidyalaya, also known as Gopiballavpur College, is an undergraduate, coeducational college situated in Gopiballavpur, Jhargram district, West Bengal. It was established in 1988. The college is under Vidyasagar University.

Departments

Arts
Bengali
English
Geography
History
Sanskrit
Santali

Science
Geography
Anthropology

Commerce
Accountancy

Accreditation
The college is recognized by the University Grants Commission (UGC).

See also

References

External links
http://www.srmv.ac.in/

Universities and colleges in Jhargram district
Colleges affiliated to Vidyasagar University
Educational institutions established in 1988
1988 establishments in West Bengal